Peavine is a census-designated place (CDP) in Adair County, Oklahoma, United States. The population was 423 at the 2010 census.

Geography
Peavine is located at  (35.901252, -94.601941).

Demographics

As of the census of 2000, there were 358 people, 131 households, and 104 families residing in the CDP. The population density was 37.9 people per square mile (14.6/km2). There were 141 housing units at an average density of 14.9/sq mi (5.8/km2). The racial makeup of the CDP was 44.13% White, 51.96% Native American, and 3.91% from two or more races. Hispanic or Latino of any race were 0.28% of the population.

There were 131 households, out of which 38.9% had children under the age of 18 living with them, 63.4% were married couples living together, 13.0% had a female householder with no husband present, and 20.6% were non-families. 19.1% of all households were made up of individuals, and 7.6% had someone living alone who was 65 years of age or older. The average household size was 2.73 and the average family size was 3.13.

In the CDP, the population was spread out, with 27.7% under the age of 18, 5.3% from 18 to 24, 33.2% from 25 to 44, 22.9% from 45 to 64, and 10.9% who were 65 years of age or older. The median age was 34 years. For every 100 females, there were 98.9 males. For every 100 females age 18 and over, there were 96.2 males.

The median income for a household in the CDP was $31,250, and the median income for a family was $34,531. Males had a median income of $24,028 versus $18,889 for females. The per capita income for the CDP was $11,416. About 18.6% of families and 16.7% of the population were below the poverty line, including 20.8% of those under age 18 and 26.9% of those age 65 or over.

References

Census-designated places in Adair County, Oklahoma
Census-designated places in Oklahoma